Zeid Bin Mutlaq Al-Ja'ba Al-Dewish Al-Mutairi (died 2004) was the co-founder and first president of Al-Nassr Football (soccer) Club in Saudi Arabia. Zeid along with his brother Hussain established in 1955, Al-Nassr Club which went on to be one of the most famous clubs in the Middle East. He became Al-Nassr president at the start in 1955 for one year until 1956. Zeid Al-Ja'ba died in 2004.

References
kooora.com 
goalzz.com 

Year of birth missing
2004 deaths
Al Nassr FC